Ridge (formerly, Cold Springs) is an unincorporated community in Mills County, Texas. According to the Handbook of Texas, the community had a population of 25 in 2000.

History
The area in what is known as Ridge today was first settled in the early 1890s. W.D. Aldridge named it when he opened a post office in his store and used the last five letters of his surname. The post office closed in 1915, after which mail was sent from Mullin. The community had a church and a cemetery in 1990 and 25 residents in 2000.

Geography

Education
Ridge had a school district in 1936. Today, the community is served by the Priddy Independent School District.

References

Unincorporated communities in Mills County, Texas
Unincorporated communities in Texas